The 2013–14 Valparaiso Crusaders men's basketball team represented Valparaiso University during the 2013–14 NCAA Division I men's basketball season. The Crusaders, led by third year head coach Bryce Drew, played their home games at the Athletics–Recreation Center and were members of the Horizon League. They finished the season 18–16, 9–7 in Horizon League play to finish in fourth place. They advanced to the second round of the Horizon League tournament where they lost to Milwaukee. They were invited to the CollegeInsider.com Tournament where they lost in the first round to Columbia.

Roster

Schedule

|-
!colspan=9 style="background:#613318; color:#FFCC00;"| Regular season

|-
!colspan=9 style="background:#613318; color:#FFCC00;"| Horizon League tournament

|-
!colspan=9 style="background:#613318; color:#FFCC00;"| CIT

References

Valparaiso
Valparaiso Beacons men's basketball seasons
Valpariso
Valp
Valp